The convex horseshoe bat (Rhinolophus convexus) is a species of bat in the family Rhinolophidae. It is found in Malaysia and Laos.

Discovery and etymology
This species was first encountered by Hungarian zoologists Gábor Csorba and Ferenc Zilahy in March 1995 in the Cameron Highlands District of Malaysia. It was described by Csorba in 1997. It was given the species name convexus in reference to the "convex outline of the posterior noseleaf." The holotype is an adult female.

Taxonomy
As the Rhinolophus genus is quite speciose, it is divided into closely related species groups. The convex horseshoe bat is placed into the pusillus species group. 

Other species belonging to this species group include:
Acuminate horseshoe bat, R. acuminatus
Little Japanese horseshoe bat, R. cornutus
Imaizumi's horseshoe bat, R. imaizumii
Blyth's horseshoe bat, R. lepidus
Formosan lesser horseshoe bat, R. monoceros
Osgood's horseshoe bat, R. osgoodi
Least horseshoe bat, R. pusillus
Shortridge's horseshoe bat, R. shortridgei
Little Nepalese horseshoe bat, R. subbadius

Description
The base of the noseleaf is narrow when viewed from the side. The lancet is short, wide, and rounded with convex margins. Its shape is similar to an equilateral triangle. The sella tapers and curves downward at the tip. Ears are small and blunted at the tip. The noseleaf, while broad, does not cover the sides of the muzzle. There are three grooves in its lower lip. Hairs are a consistent color from base to tip. Flight membranes are dark in color. The last vertebra of the tail extends slightly past the uropatagium.

Range and habitat
The other known individual was collected in front of a cave in Laos, but its taxonomic validity may be questionable.

Conservation
Only two individuals of this species have ever been observed. There is almost no information about their biology, ecology, population number, or range. Because of this, the IUCN lists it as data deficient.

References

Endemic fauna of Malaysia
Bats of Malaysia
Rhinolophidae
Mammals described in 1997
Taxonomy articles created by Polbot